"Highly Strung" is a song by English new wave band Spandau Ballet, released as the third single from the 1984 album Parade. In their native UK, the song reached number 15 on the UK Singles Chart, and critics had a variety of responses to it. The music video used the population density of Hong Kong to demonstrate the song's emotional themes.

Background, release and commercial performance
When Spandau Ballet guitarist/songwriter Gary Kemp was working on their first single "To Cut a Long Story Short" with producer Richard James Burgess and was wanting to remix that song for the B-side of the 7-inch single, he had in mind the reggae dubs and remixes done by King Tubby and Lee "Scratch" Perry dating back to the sixties. They thought of the remix for that song as having been inspired by those recordings rather than as an attempt at performing an all-out reggae version of the song, and they borrowed the terminology from those record labels by using the subtitle "Version", which they also did for the B-side of the 7-inch single of "Highly Strung". Kemp was quoted as saying that "Highly Strung" would be reminiscent of their 1981 hit "Chant No. 1 (I Don't Need This Pressure On)".

Recorded in spring 1984, "Highly Strung" was released in the UK on 8 October of that year and peaked at number 15 there. It also reached number 18 in Ireland, number 36 in the Netherlands, number 46 in New Zealand and number 83 in Australia.

Critical reception
Mike Read of Smash Hits wrote, "The winning combination of Gary Kemp's songs and Tony Hadley's voice contrives unchecked, although it has neither the aggression of 'Musclebound' nor the sensitivity of 'True'. 'Highly Strung' will be much played, highly vaunted and a sizeable hit." Number Ones Paul Simper was not impressed: Eleanor Levy of Record Mirror disagreed, describing "Highly Strung" as "probably the best track off the abysmal Parade album."

Music video
An article in Billboard magazine at the time of the song's UK release reported the band was "believed to be the first major pop act to make a high-budget promotional music video on location in Hong Kong." Spandau saxophonist Steve Norman told Smash Hits, "We don't just use these locations for the sake of it… 'Highly Strung' is about pressure and claustrophobia—there are more people per square inch in Hong Kong than anywhere in the world." The band was also interested in filming in mainland China but applied too late to get permission. Billboard explained, "The summit talks about the eventual handing over of Hong Kong to the Chinese in 1997 helped fuel enthusiasm for making the video in this territory."

The video shows the band and a local model, played by Sally Kwok, involved in a series of photo shoots that leave her short-tempered and unwilling to be photographed elsewhere. The last scene shows her riding a bike along a country road and approaching a gated chain-link fence with barbed wire, which was supposed to convey her escape to China to find relief.

When the band returned to Hong Kong during their 2015 world tour, Richard Lord of the South China Morning Post described the video as "a retrospectively hilarious collection of Sino-clichés."

Track listing7-inch singleA. "Highly Strung" – 4:10
B. "Highly Strung" Version – 4:0512-inch singleA. "Highly Re-strung" – 5:27
B. "Highly Strung" (Extended Version) – 5:17

Personnel
Credits adapted from the liner notes for Parade:Spandau Ballet Tony Hadley – lead vocals
 Gary Kemp – guitar and backing vocals
 Martin Kemp – bass
 Steve Norman – saxophone and percussion
 John Keeble – drumsAdditional musician Jess Bailey – keyboardsProduction'
 Tony Swain – producer, engineer
 Steve Jolley – producer
 Spandau Ballet – producers
 Richard Lengyel – engineering assistance
 Pete Hillier – equipment
 Nick Sibley – equipment
 David Band – illustration
 Mixed at Musicland Studios (Munich)

Charts

Notes

References

1984 songs
1984 singles
Spandau Ballet songs
Chrysalis Records singles
Songs written by Gary Kemp
Song recordings produced by Jolley & Swain